Jason Young may refer to:

 Jason Young (curler) (born 1979), Canadian curler 
 Jason Young (baseball) (born 1979), Major League Baseball pitcher
 Jason Young (discus thrower) (born 1981), American discus thrower
 Jason Young (sprinter) (born 1991), Jamaican sprinter
 Jason Young (fighter) (born 1986), English mixed martial artist
 Jason Young (ice hockey) (born 1972), German-Canadian ice hockey player for the Frankfurt Lions
 Jason Young (Australian cricketer) (born 1971), Australian cricketer
 Jason Young (Zimbabwean cricketer) (born 1979), Zimbabwean cricketer
 Jason Young (actor) (born 1980), Thai actor and singer